Hemond is a surname. Notable people with the surname include:

Harry Hemond, American engineer
Roland Hemond (1929-2021), American baseball executive
Scott Hemond (born 1965), American baseball player